= Thambatty =

Village in Tamil Nadu, India

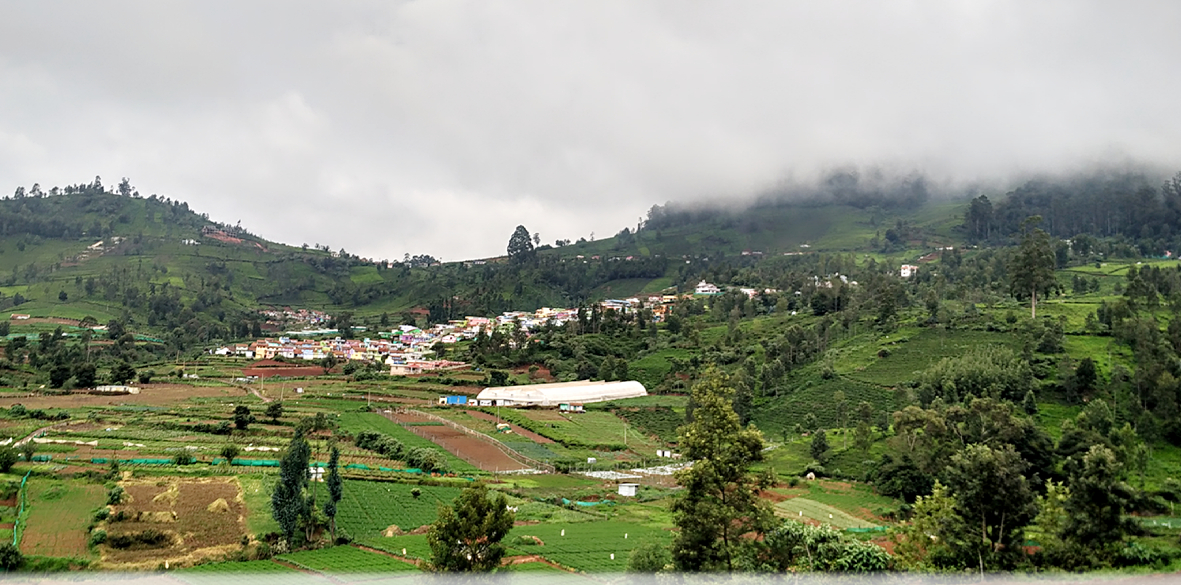
Thambatty

Thambatty is a village which is 11 km from Ooty in Tamil Nadu, India. It is surrounded by mountains and tea estates. Local agriculture includes tea gardens, and strawberries and vegetables are cultivated. It has hosted movie shootings.

The centre of the village is surrounded by temples. Every year people celebrate Mari habba, which is a springtime fest in Thambatty. People from the village return for the festival, and involves worship, badaga songs, masti badaga dance, badaga play, food and drinks, and socialising. Home-made foods like "Thupadittu" (made of maida and ghee), "Rava laddoo", mixture, vada, paiyasam, etc., are specialties of the festival.
